Start Today is an album by Gorilla Biscuits. It is considered an influential recording in hardcore punk, with NME naming it among the genre's 15 best albums of all time. It is the biggest selling record released by Revelation Records with copies in excess of 100,000 sold on CD alone.

Track listing
All songs written by Walter Schreifels, except where noted.

 Tracks 13 and 14 are also available on the Gorilla Biscuits album and are unlisted.

Performers
 Anthony "CIV" Civarelli - vocals
 Walter Schreifels - guitar
 Alex Brown - guitar
 Arthur Smilios - bass guitar
 Luke Abbey - drums
 Toby Morse - backing vocals

References 

1989 albums
Revelation Records albums
Gorilla Biscuits albums
Albums produced by Don Fury